Goss is an unincorporated community in Marion County located 8 miles northwest of Columbia.

History
Goss was named for its first postmaster, Dr. Zeno Goss, who established a post office in 1891 or 1895. Doctor Goss practiced medicine in the area, and was known for having fought as a Confederate soldier in the Battle of Shiloh. Prior to taking the Goss name, the community was known as "Rogers." The town is currently situated along the route of a decommissioned Illinois Central rail line, running parallel to Mississippi Highway 13. The rail line was originally established as the Columbia, Lumberton & Gulf Railroad in 1894, and, when the line expanded circa 1900 as the Gulf and Ship Island Railroad, it included service near Goss at milepost 100.32, which spurred the development of lumber and sawmill industries over the years.   The Georgia Pacific lumberyard  was once Goss's largest business, but is now closed.

Present day

Goss is served by the Columbia School District. 

Goss is served by The Tri-Community Volunteer Fire Department.

References 

Unincorporated communities in Marion County, Mississippi
Unincorporated communities in Mississippi